Crime + Investigation (also known as CI) is an Australian pay television channel which focuses on crime, investigation and mystery programming. It is run by Foxtel Management Pty Ltd and programming and name are licensed to them by A&E Television Networks.

The channel shows a variety of shows dealing with criminal investigations. The content is mostly sourced from overseas except for limited original content such as the popular Crime Investigation Australia hosted by Steve Liebmann focusing on infamous Australian crimes.

In 2007, the channel became available in New Zealand on Sky, channel 71.

Programming
Accident Investigator
Child Snatchers
Cold Case Files
COPS
Crime Investigation Australia
Crimes That Shook Australia
Forensic Files
Gangland
Homicide Hunter
Kings Cross ER: St Vincent's Hospital
Masterminds
Paradise Lost
Road Wars
Rookies
Street Patrol
S.W.A.T.
Snapped
Tough Nuts: Australia's Hardest Criminals
The Art of the Heist
The New Detectives
Trace Evidence
Bounty Girls

See also
Crime & Investigation Network (UK)
Crime & Investigation Network

References

External links
 

Television networks in Australia
Television channels and stations established in 2005
2005 establishments in Australia
English-language television stations in Australia
English-language television stations in New Zealand
A&E Networks
Foxtel
Crime television networks